Curtorim Assembly constituency is one of the 40 Goa Legislative Assembly constituencies of the state of Goa in southern India. Curtorim is also one of the 20 constituencies falling under the South Goa Lok Sabha constituency.

Members of the Legislative Assembly

Election results

2022 result

2017

See also
 List of constituencies of the Goa Legislative Assembly
 South Goa district

References

External links
  

South Goa district
Assembly constituencies of Goa